James Downey (born 19 October 1987 in Gympie, Queensland, Australia) is an Australian footballer who currently plays for Ballarat Red Devils in the National Premier Leagues Victoria Division 1.

Club career
Downey was with the Queensland Academy of Sport between 2003 and 2004 before joining the Australian Institute of Sport in 2005. Downey holds the AIS football program beep test record (16.3).

In March 2007 Downey was signed by Perth Glory where he is contracted to the end of the 2009/2010 A-League season. On 12 January 2010, it was announced he would be joining North Queensland for the rest of the 2009–10 season in a swap for striker Daniel McBreen.

He was released, along with all other North Queensland players. He signed up for Dutch Eerste Divisie side Sparta in July 2010.

He has come back to Australia and is playing with local club the Oakleigh Cannons, in the Victorian Premier League in a bid to gain a professional contract with an A-League club.
He scored his first goal for the club against St Albans Saints. He scored his second goal for the opening the scoring, against the Green Gully Cavaliers

He was signed by New Zealand A-League team Wellington Phoenix for the 2011–12 A-League season. 
Downey was released in June 2013. A persistent knee injury kept Downey out of professional football until January 2015 when it was announced that he had signed for Ballarat Red Devils ahead of their maiden season in National Premier Leagues Victoria 1, after training with the team for the entire 2014 NPLV season during his rehabilitation.

International career
Downey has played 13 games for the Young Socceroos, scoring one goal. He has also been called up for the Australia under 17 team.

Career statistics 
(Correct as of 6 May 2011)

References

External links
 Perth Glory profile

1987 births
Living people
People from Gympie
Australian soccer players
Australia youth international soccer players
Australia under-20 international soccer players
Australian expatriate soccer players
Perth Glory FC players
Sparta Rotterdam players
A-League Men players
Wellington Phoenix FC players
Ballarat City FC players
Northern Fury FC players
Eerste Divisie players
Expatriate footballers in the Netherlands
Australian Institute of Sport soccer players
Association football defenders
Association football midfielders